Craig Ballantyne (born 2 May 1975) is a South African former cricketer. He played in four first-class matches for Border in 1994/95 and 1995/96.

See also
 List of Border representative cricketers

References

External links
 

1975 births
Living people
South African cricketers
Border cricketers
People from Queenstown, South Africa
Cricketers from the Eastern Cape